Bernadette Mary Luciano is a New Zealand Italian language and culture academic, and a full professor at the University of Auckland. Luciano serves as Italian honorary consul in Auckland.

Academic career

After a 1990 PhD thesis titled  'Porta and Dante: a study of Porta's translations from the "Inferno"'  at Columbia University, Luciano worked in many American universities, before moving to the University of Auckland and rising to full professor.

Selected works 
 Luciano, Bernadette, and Susanna Scarparo. Reframing Italy: New Trends in Italian Women's Filmmaking. Purdue University Press, 2013.
 Luciano, Bernadette. "The Diaries of Sibilla Aleramo: Constructing Female Subjectivity." Italian Women Writers from the Renaissance to the Present: Revising the Canon (1996): 95–110.
 Luciano, Bernadette, and Susanna Scarparo. "Gendering mobility and migration in contemporary Italian cinema." The Italianist 30, no. 2 (2010): 165–182.
 Luciano, Bernadette. "Rethinking identity in the cinema of Silvio Soldini." In Forum for Modern Language Studies, vol. 38, no. 3, pp. 341–351. Oxford University Press, 2002.

References

Living people
New Zealand women academics
Columbia University alumni
Stanford University alumni
Academic staff of the University of Auckland
New Zealand people of Italian descent
21st-century New Zealand translators
21st-century New Zealand linguists
Year of birth missing (living people)
New Zealand women writers